Penyrheol Halt railway station served the area of Penyrheol, in the historical county of Glamorgan, Wales, from 1894 to 1964 on the Senghenydd branch of the Rhymney Railway.

History
The station was opened on 1 February 1894 by the Rhymney Railway. It was downgraded to an unstaffed halt in 1930, although this change only appeared in the timetables from 1952. The station closed on 15 June 1964.

References

Disused railway stations in Caerphilly County Borough
Former Rhymney Railway stations
Railway stations in Great Britain opened in 1894
Railway stations in Great Britain closed in 1964
1894 establishments in Wales
1964 disestablishments in Wales
Beeching closures in Wales